Gökçebağ can refer to:

 Gökçebağ, Ayaş
 Gökçebağ, Burdur
 Gökçebağ, Merzifon